Pocket Pool is a game released for the PlayStation Portable gaming system, developed in France by Hyper-Devbox Japan and published by both Conspiracy Entertainment and Eidos. The game was originally expected to have the Girls Gone Wild license but the publishers were unable to negotiate terms.

Gameplay

The game is a 3D pool game, featuring 13 different play modes. The player is able to unlock erotic images and videos of various models presented in the game.

Reception
The game was mostly panned, receiving the following ratings:
4.0 points out of 10 from IGN
3.4 points out of 10 on GameSpot 
2.0 points out of 10 from TotalPlayStation
1.5 points out of 10 on 1up

Tie-ins
All of the model videos featured in the game were released by Conspiracy Theory under the title Dream Models, a UMD movie.

References

External links
Conspiracy Entertainment official site

2007 video games
Erotic video games
PlayStation Portable games
PlayStation Portable-only games
Cue sports video games
Video games developed in France
Conspiracy Entertainment games
Multiplayer and single-player video games